Adolf Piwarski (1817–1870) was a Polish miniaturist painter and graphic artist. His father, Jan Feliks Piwarski (1794–1859), was also a famous Polish painter and graphic designer, founder of the print room at Warsaw University.

References

External links

Works by Adolf Piwarski at  Europeana European culture project. Accessed 18 Nov 2011

1817 births
1870 deaths
19th-century Polish painters
19th-century Polish male artists
Polish male painters